Emily Thomson may refer to:

 Emily Thomson (footballer) (born 1993), Scottish footballer
 Emily Thomson (medical practitioner) (c. 1864–1955), co-founder of Dundee Women's Hospital
 E. Gertrude Thomson (1850–1929), British artist and illustrator

See also
 Emily Thompson (born 1962), American historian